An episode from the Legend of Saint Ladislaus provided the subjects for numerous murals painted in medieval churches in Hungary during the 14th to 16th century.

Historical background
Ladislaus I of Hungary was a chivalrous king in Hungary in the 11th century. Before becoming the ruler, together with his brother Géza, and king Solomon of Hungary, he fought in Transylvania against armies of Pechenegs and Cumans invading from the steppes. In the story illustrated by the murals,  at the Kerlés battlefield Ladislaus observed that a warrior tried to abduct a Hungarian girl. The royal saint pursued and overcame the warrior and   liberated the girl.  The battle of the Christian king symbolises the victory of Christianity over paganism. The legends of King Saint Ladislaus have been written about by chroniclers and depicted in various ways in the visual arts. Frescoes and paintings of the legend can be found on the walls of many medieval Hungarian churches.

Sequence of the images in the Saint Ladislaus legend mural 
The sequence of the events portrayed is generally similar all over the churches in medieval Hungary.
Saint Ladislaus riding his horse in the battlefield catches sight of a pagan warrior holding a Hungarian girl in his saddle. 
Saint Ladislaus begins to pursue him. 
In the last metres before Saint Ladislaus could reach the pagan to stab him, he could not catch up to him
Saint Ladislaus shouts to the girl: "Catch hold of the pagan at his belt and jump to the ground!" 
The girl does so, and the two warriors, the king and the pagan, begin wrestling. 
Saint Ladislaus can not subdue him, therefore the girl helps the king. She cuts the pagan's Achilles tendon.
Saint Ladislaus beheads the pagan with the help of the girl.
In the last scene the girl is resting in the arms of Saint Ladislaus.

The Saint Ladislaus legend in the medieval churches of Hungary 
Archaeologist Gyula László collected the documents of fifty churches all around the Carpathian basin, where mural had been painted in medieval churches in Hungary. Some of them had been demolished (for example the churches at Homoródszentmárton and Homoródokland), but some of them had been copied in 19th century sketches by József Huszka. These are preserved in the National Heritage Protection Office in Hungary.

Most of the murals were painted during the reigns of Charles I of Hungary, Louis I of Hungary, and Sigismund, Holy Roman Emperor. During their  period of rule Saint Ladislaus became the ideal of the ruler kings therefore these kings chose their burying-place at the cathedral of Nagyvárad.

Mythological interpretation 
Before Gyula László, Géza Nagy suggested that an ancient Eurasian myth  is behind the Christianized mural painting. The old myth is expressed by the fight between the two heroes representing light and darkness. In the literature the ballad of Anna Molnár also is related to the Saint Ladislaus legend.

Further reading 
 Bertényi Iván (1996): Szent László kultuszának Anjou-kori történetéhez. (Towards a history of the Saint Ladislaus tradition). Századok, 1996. 985–989. old.
 Gyöngyössy János, Kerny Terézia, Sarudi Sebestyén József (1995): Székelyföldi vártemplomok. (Fortress churches in Székelyföld.) Tájak-Korok-Múzeumok Könyvtára 5. szám, Budapest
 Hankovszky Béla, Kerny Terézia, Móser Zoltán (2000): Ave Rex Ladislaus. (Gloria to Ladislaus king). Paulus Hungarus - Kairosz, Budapest
 Jankovics Marcell (2006): Csillagok között fényességes csillag. A Szent László legenda és a csillagos ég. (Star brighting between stars. The Saint Ladislaus legend and the heavenly constellations.) Méry Ratio Kiadó, Helikon, Budapest
 László Gyula (1993): A Szent László-legenda középkori falképei. (The medieval murals of the Saint Ladislaus legend.) Tájak-Korok-Múzeumok Könyvtára 4. szám, Budapest
 Madas E., Török L., Vargyas L. (1980): Athleta Patriae. Tanulmányok Szent László történetéhez. (Athlete of the Country: Studies of Saint Ladislaus.) Szent István Társulat Kiadó, Budapest 
 Madas Edit, Horváth Zoltán György (2008): Középkori prédikációk és falképek Szent László királyról/ San Ladislao d'Ungheria nella predicazione e nei dipinti murali. (Medieval sermons and murals of Saint Ladislaus.) 464. old. Romanika Kiadó, Budapest, 
 Magyar Zoltán (1996): Keresztény lovagoknak oszlopa” (Szent László a magyar kultúrtörténetben) (Column of Christian chavaliers.) Nemzeti Tankönyvkiadó, Budapest
 Mezey László (szerk.) (1980): Athleta patriae. Tanulmányok Szent László történetéhez. Budapest
 Bérczi Sz., Bérczi K., Bérczi Zs. (1998): Szent László kifestő. (Saint Ladislaus booklet.) In Hungarian. TKTE and Uniconstant, Piremon Vámospércs

See also 
Anjou Legendarium

External links 

Images of the Legend of Saint Ladislaus of the 14th & 15th Centuries.
Canonisation of Saint Ladislaus king.
About Saint Ladislaus legend.
The Saint Ladislaus legend in the Unitarian church of Homorodkaracsonyfalva.
The Saint Ladislaus legend in the Catholic church of Gelence.
The Saint Ladislaus legend in Codex Érdy.
The Saint Ladislaus legend in the Encyclopedia of Ethnography.
Medieval Hungarian Murals.
Mural in Székelyderzs Unitarian Church: The Saint Ladislaus legend.

References 

Hungarian Roman Catholic saints
Medieval Hungarian saints
Hungarian legends